The 1955 Cupa României Final was the 18th final of Romania's most prestigious football cup competition. It was disputed between CCA București and Progresul Oradea, and was won by CCA București after a game with 9 goals, in extra time. It was the 5th cup for CCA București.

Progresul Oradea was the forth club representing Divizia B which reached the Romanian Cup final, after CAM Timișoara in 1938, Flacăra Mediaş in 1951 and Metalul Reșița in 1954.

Match details

See also 
List of Cupa României finals

References

External links
Romaniansoccer.ro

1955
Cupa
Romania
Cupa României Final